The National Abortion Federation (NAF) is the professional association of abortion providers. NAF members include private and non-profit clinics, Planned Parenthood affiliates, women's health centers, physicians' offices, and hospitals who together perform approximately half of the abortions in the U.S. and Canada each year. NAF members also include public hospitals and both public and private clinics in Mexico City and private clinics in Colombia. Katherine Hancock Ragsdale, an Episcopal priest, was the President and CEO of NAF until October 2021.  As of November 2021, NAF is searching for a new President and CEO.

NAF was established in 1977 with the merger of the National Association of Abortion Facilities (NAAF), founded by Merle Hoffman, and the National Abortion Council (NAC). One of its founders was Frances Kissling, later president of Catholics for a Free Choice.   

NAF publishes Clinical Policy Guidelines for Abortion Care (CPGs), which set the standards for abortion procedures. First published in 1996 and revised annually, the CPGs distill a large body of medical knowledge into guidelines developed by consensus, based on rigorous review of relevant literature and known patient outcomes. NAF indicates that "In order to become a member, a clinic must complete a rigorous application process. Member clinics have agreed to comply with our standards for quality and care, updated annually in our Clinical Policy Guidelines. NAF periodically conducts site visits to confirm that our clinics are in compliance with our guidelines."

NAF is funded by donation only and is a registered charity.

Canadian Public Policy and Outreach Program 

NAF launched a Canadian Public Policy and Outreach Program on May 16, 2006, with the support of Senator Lucie Pépin, Federal MP and former Minister of State for Health Carolyn Bennett and NDP Status of Women Critic Irene Mathyssen. The program offers Canadian women abortion referrals, options counseling and post-abortion counseling through the NAF toll-free helpline, and French language website support.

NAF has taken issue with the Canadian Medical Association's (CMA) abortion referral policy which allows physicians to refuse to refer women to abortion providers in accordance with their conscience and CMA Policy - Induced Abortion.  If pressed, a physician must indicate alternative sources where a woman might obtain a referral.  NAF has lobbied to require Canadian physicians to opt out of provincial healthcare plans entirely if they do not refer for abortion.

Canadian database

The National Abortion Federation of Canada provides a detailed list of abortion clinics by province and the maximum gestational period that the clinic will provide abortion up to. The website also has other resources, including information on referrals and how to obtain financial support for travel expenses, after-treatment supplies, child care and various other needs.

References

External links
 

American abortion providers
Abortion-rights organizations in the United States
1977 establishments in Washington, D.C.
Organizations established in 1977
Women's health movement